The São Vicente Island Cup (Portuguese: Taça/Copa da Ilha de São Vicente, Capeverdean Crioulo, ALUPEC or ALUPEK: Tasa/Kopa da Idja di Sau Visenti) is cup competition played during the season in the island of São Vicente, Cape Verde, it consists of all the clubs from all the two regional divisions and are divided into about five to six rounds.  The cup tournament is organized by the São Vicente Regional Football Association (Associação Regional de São Vicente de Futebol, ARSVF). The cup winner competed in the regional super cup final in the following season.  For several seasons, the winner qualified into Cape Verdean Cup which has been cancelled due to financial and scheduling reasons.

Batuque won the most cup titles numbering six, second is Derby with four, third is Mindelense with three, fourth is Falcões do Norte with four and last are Académica do Mindelo, Ribeira Bote and Salamansa.

Its recent cup winner is Batuque who won their next cup title after defeating Derby on May 6.

Winners

Performance By Club

Performance by area

See also
São Vicente SuperCup
São Vicente Opening Tournament
São Vicente Island League
Sports in São Vicente, Cape Verde

References

Sport in São Vicente, Cape Verde
Football cup competitions in Cape Verde
2000 establishments in Cape Verde
Recurring sporting events established in 2000